The following is a list of deputy chairmen of the Federation Council of Russia.

First deputy chairmen

Deputy chairmen

Notes

Bibliography
Europa World Year Book 1995, 1997, 1999, 2002, 2003, 2004

Russia, Federation Council
Russia, Federation Council 
Federation Council, Deputy Chairmen